Deinopa is a genus of moths of the family Erebidae erected by Francis Walker in 1856. The genus was previously classified in the subfamily Calpinae of the family Noctuidae.

Species
Deinopa angitia (Druce, 1891) Mexico
Deinopa delinquens (Walker, 1858) Brazil (Amazonas)
Deinopa erecta (Walker, 1862)
Deinopa notabilis Walker, 1856 – type species
Deinopa signiplena Walker, 1862
Deinopa transcissaria (Walker, 1866) Brazil (Amazonas)

References

Anobinae
Moth genera